Airsport sro is a Czech aircraft manufacturer based in Zbraslavice. The company specializes in the design and manufacture of microlight aircraft and motorgliders in the form of kits for amateur construction and ready-to-fly aircraft for the European Fédération Aéronautique Internationale microlight category.

The organization is a Czech společnost s ručením omezeným (sro), or private limited company.

The company has three designs in production as of 2015, all constructed from composite materials. The Airsport Sonet is a light touring aircraft derived from the Airsport Sonata motorglider. The Airsport Song is a single-seat motorglider, with an unusual twin-boom and inverted V-tail layout.

Aircraft

References

External links

Aircraft manufacturers of the Czech Republic and Czechoslovakia
Czech brands
Ultralight aircraft
Homebuilt aircraft